Stephen James Cook (born 31 July 1953) is a former South African association football and cricketer who played in three cricket Test matches and four One Day Internationals from 1991 to 1993. His son Stephen Cook currently plays for Gauteng and the national side, the Proteas. He played football for Wits University while studying for a teaching degree in the late seventies and featured in the 1978 Mainstay Cup Final.

Cook was a prolific opening batsman both in his native South Africa and for Somerset County Cricket Club but South Africa's exclusion from Test cricket cost him a significant Test career. He played in all 19 of South Africa's 'unofficial Test matches' against rebel sides. Aged 39 and having waited two decades for an official Test cap, he edged Kapil Dev's opening ball, a late outswinger, to third slip in the First Test between South Africa and India at Durban in November 1992, to become the first debutant to be dismissed by the first ball of a Test match; Leon Garrick of the West Indies also suffered this fate nine years later.

Originally a middle-order batsman for Transvaal, his career blossomed when he converted to the opening position. He formed a formidable opening partnership with Henry Fotheringham, helping the Transvaal dominate the domestic scene in the 1980s. He captained the province later on in his career, and remains the third highest run scorer in South African first class cricket.

Ignored by county cricket in England until late in his career, he scored over 7,500 runs for Somerset in his three seasons with the club, including 28 hundreds. In 270 first-class matches, he scored 21,143 runs with a top score of 313* at an average of 50.58. He scored 64 first-class hundreds. In 286 List A cricket games, he made 10,639 runs at 41.39 with a best of 177.

After Cook retired he became director of coaching with the UCBSA, and had an unsuccessful spell with Hampshire which ended in 2002. As a coach at King Edward School in Johannesburg he oversaw the development of Graeme Smith.

References

External links
 

1953 births
Living people
South Africa Test cricketers
South Africa One Day International cricketers
South African cricketers
South African people of British descent
Gauteng cricketers
Somerset cricketers
Wisden Cricketers of the Year
Sportspeople from Johannesburg
South African cricket coaches
Bidvest Wits F.C. players
Association footballers not categorized by position
South African soccer players
White South African people